Contemporary Art Museum  may refer to:
A museum whose emphasis is primarily or exclusively dedicated to Contemporary art

Specific institutions include:

Chateau de Montsoreau-Museum of Contemporary Art, Montsoreau Loire Valley, France.
The Aldrich Contemporary Art Museum, Ridgefield, Connecticut, United States
ART4.RU Contemporary Art Museum, Moscow, Russia
Blue Star Contemporary Art Museum, San Antonio, Texas, United States
Contemporary Art Museum of Raleigh, Raleigh, North Carolina, United States
Contemporary Art Museum St. Louis, St. Louis, Missouri, United States
Istanbul Contemporary Art Museum, Istanbul, Turkey
Niterói Contemporary Art Museum, Niterói, Brazil

See also
Contemporary Arts Museum Houston
 List of contemporary art museums